Events from 2022 in American Samoa.

Incumbents 

 US House Delegate: Amata Coleman Radewagen
 Governor: Lemanu Peleti Mauga
 Lieutenant Governor: Salo Ale

Events 
Ongoing – COVID-19 pandemic in Oceania; COVID-19 pandemic in American Samoa

 15 January – A Tsunami warning is issued in American Samoa following the Hunga Ha'apai eruption, the warning is later cancelled.
 19 January – A seventh passenger from a Hawaiian Airlines flight from Honolulu, Hawaii, tests positive for COVID-19. The plane landed in American Samoa on January 6, 2022.
 8 November –2022 United States House of Representatives election in American Samoa

Sports 

 4 – 20 September: American Samoa at the 2022 Winter Olympics

References 

2022 in American Samoa
2020s in American Samoa
Years of the 21st century in American Samoa
American Samoa